The Little Peasant is a 1918 oil painting of a youth by Amedeo Modigliani. It is located in the Tate Gallery in London. The painting has a faint chromatism, a delicate color variation and harmony.

It was painted in Nice, based on a room in which Modigliani also painted Jeanne Hébuterne.

References

Paintings by Amedeo Modigliani